The giant leopard moth (Hypercompe scribonia) is a moth of the family Erebidae. They are distributed through North America from southern Ontario, and southern and eastern United States through New England, Mexico, and south to Colombia. The obsolete name, Ecpantheria scribonia, is still occasionally encountered.

Its wings are bright white with a pattern of neat black blotches, some solid and some hollow. The overside of the abdomen is dark blue with orange markings, while the underside is white with solid black spots, and males have a narrow yellow line on the sides. Their legs have black and white bands. Adult moths are strictly nocturnal and do not generally fly before nightfall.

In Missouri, adults are on the wing from May to September and are multivoltine. During mating sessions, the wings of the male cover most of the female's abdomen, which can sometimes lead to the loss of wing scales in the female and have negative effects on her flight efficiency. Their mating sessions are notably long-lasting, taking more than 24 hours. They stay mostly immobile during the whole process, but move from spot to spot to thermoregulate, walking into shadowy areas if too hot or into sunlight if too cold. The male effectuates the locomotion, while the female folds her legs to make her easier to carry.

The caterpillar is of the "woolly bear" kind, with a thick coat of black bristles (setae) and red or orange bands between its segments, which become conspicuous when the caterpillar rolls into a ball for defense. Like the banded woolly bear, its hairs are not urticant nor venomous and do not typically cause irritation. The moth overwinters as a caterpillar, often under the bark of decaying wood.

Recorded food plants

The caterpillar eats a variety of broadleaf plants, such as broadleaf plantains, dandelions, and violets:

Gallery

References

External links

 Hilton Pond Center
 Entweb
 Species Hypercompe scribonia – giant leopard moth - Hodges#8146, BugGuide

Moths of North America
Hypercompe
Moths described in 1790